Aglaia pyriformis is a species of plant in the family Meliaceae endemic to the Philippines.

References

Flora of the Philippines
pyriformis
Vulnerable plants
Endemic flora of the Philippines
Taxonomy articles created by Polbot